Street Sense (foaled February 23, 2004 in Kentucky at Chesapeake Farm) is a champion American Thoroughbred racehorse who won the 2006 Breeders' Cup Juvenile and 2007 Kentucky Derby and was the 2006 Champion Two-Year-Old.

Background
Owned and bred by James B. Tafel, Street Sense is out of Bedazzle, a granddaughter of Northern Dancer, and his sire is 2002 Dubai World Cup-winner Street Cry.

Racing career

2006: Two-Year-Old Season
Trained by Carl Nafzger and ridden by Calvin Borel, Street Sense broke his maiden at Arlington Park. He then finished third in the Arlington-Washington Futurity Stakes and third in the Lane's End Breeders' Futurity behind Great Hunter and Circular Quay.

On November 4, 2006, Street Sense won the most important race for two-year-old colts in the United States, the Breeders' Cup Juvenile, by a record 10 lengths. He was voted the 2006 Eclipse Award as the U.S. Champion Two-Year-Old Colt.

2007: Three-Year-Old Season
Street Sense wintered at the Palm Meadows Thoroughbred Training Center in Florida. In 2007, he followed the trail to the U.S. Triple Crown series. On March 17, in his first race as a three-year-old, he won the Tampa Bay Derby by half a nose over Any Given Saturday in a track record-breaking time for the one-and-one-sixteenth-mile distance.

Street Sense was beaten by Dominican (11th in the 2007 Kentucky Derby, having broken from post 19) in his last start before the Derby, in a photo finish in the Blue Grass Stakes at Keeneland. The slow pace of the race meant most of the field had something left toward the finish - the first five horses home were separated by only a few lengths at the wire.

Street Sense won the Kentucky Derby on May 5, 2007, paying $11.80 to win on a $2 wager. He rallied from a second-to-last deficit to beat Hard Spun by 2 lengths. This victory made him the first winner of the Breeders' Cup Juvenile ever to win the Kentucky Derby and the first U.S. Champion Two-Year-Old Colt to win the Derby since Spectacular Bid in 1979.

Street Sense went into the second jewel of the Triple Crown as the favorite, but finished second by a nose to eventual two-time Horse of the year Curlin in the Preakness Stakes at Pimlico Race Course on May 19, 2007. The 9-horse field included Derby runner-up Hard Spun, Curlin, sixth-place finisher Circular Quay, Mint Slewlep, Xchanger, King of the Roxy, Flying First Class, and C P West.

Owner James Tafel decided not to run Street Sense in the Belmont Stakes, looking to regroup for major races later in the year. On August 25, 2007, ridden by Calvin Borel, Street Sense won the Grade I $1-million Travers Stakes, at Saratoga Race Course in Saratoga Springs, New York.  He was the first horse to win both the Travers and Kentucky Derby since Thunder Gulch did it in 1995.

On September 29, he placed second in the 1-mile Grade II Kentucky Cup Classic Stakes on Polytrack at Turfway Park behind Hard Spun.  In his racing career, he was 0 for 3 on Polytrack.

Street Sense closed out his career with a fourth-place finish on a sloppy track in the October 27, 2007, running of the Breeders' Cup Classic at Monmouth Park Racetrack. He retired to stud with earnings of $4,383,200.

Retirement
On June 2, 2007, Tafel sold Street Sense's breeding rights to Mohammed bin Rashid Al Maktoum's Darley Stud. The colt continued to be trained by Carl Nafzger and raced under Tafel's name through the 2007 Breeders' Cup Classic. His retirement was announced on October 30, 2007. He now stands at Darley's Jonabell Farm near Lexington, Ky. His stud fee in 2008 was $75,000, but was reduced to $40,000 per live foal for 2011. He was exported to Darley Japan in 2013, but only stood for one year before returning to the U.S. in 2014. After covering a few high quality books of mares and siring a slew of stakes winners in 2021 & 2022, Street Sense's fee gradually rose back to $75,000 (2020, 2022, 2023).

Stud Record

Notable progeny

c = colt, f = filly, g = gelding''

Races

Pedigree

References

 Pedigree and racing stats for Street Sense at PedigreeQuery.com
 Stats and Bio, NTRA
 

2004 racehorse births
Racehorses bred in Kentucky
Racehorses trained in the United States
Breeders' Cup Juvenile winners
Eclipse Award winners
Kentucky Derby winners
Thoroughbred family 22-b